Arminius is a line of revolvers manufactured by Weihrauch & Weihrauch GmbH & Co. KG, of Mellrichstadt, Germany, a manufacturer of target and sporting air rifles, air pistols, cartridge rifles and pistols.

History
Weihrauch's first model revolver was the HW-3 produced in 1960, followed in 1962 by the HW-4, and since 1965 the HW-5. These revolvers were named after the chief of the Germanic Cherusci tribe, Arminius (Latinized name) who led Teutonic warriors during the later stages of Roman Emperor Augustus' reign.

US imports and rebrands 

Over the past fifty years the various Arminius models have been imported into the United States by different companies. these include Firearms Import & Export (F.I.E.) of Hialeah/Miami, Florida. Various importers often renamed the models to make them more marketable to U.S. gun buyers.

 Herters imported the HW-7 .22 caliber revolver as the Herter's Guide Model. 
 L.A. Distributors of Brooklyn, New York imported the HW-5 as The Omega while the HW-3 was the Dickson Bulldog.
 F.I.E. imported the HW-357 as the FIE Titan Tiger.
 European American Armory (EAA) imported the HW-357 as the EAA-Arminius Windicator and was given a heavy full shroud barrel. EAA also imported the various Single Action Army clones as the Hombre and Bounty Hunter.

Models 

Note that "HW" stands for Hermann Weihrauch, the founder of Weihrauch & Weihrauch GmbH & Co. KG.

 Arminius HW-1 starter gun
 HW 3 Double Action Revolver in .22 long rifle, .22 Winchester Magnum, and .32 S & W long
 HW 3 "Duo" version with two cylinders; one in .22 Win Mag. and the other in .22 L. R.
 HW-4 - 8 .22 LR snub nose revolver
 HW 5 Double Action Revolver in .22 long rifle, .22 Winchester Magnum, and .32 S & W long
 HW 5 "Duo" version with two cylinders; one in .22 Win Mag. and the other in .22 L. R.
 HW 7 Double Action Revolver in .22 long rifle, .22 Winchester Magnum, and .32 S & W long
 "Duo" version with two cylinders; one in .22 Win Mag. and the other in .22 L. R.
 HW 9, 6 inch barrelled .22 LR "sport" revolvers
 HW 10, 5 shot 9 mm R. NC. blank firing revolver
 HW 22, 8 round .22 LR
 HW 357 "Hunter" and HW 357 T, both are 6 round .357 magnum revolvers with "T" being the Target variant, 
 HW 37, 5 shot 9mm R. NC. blank and gas (CN or CS) cartridges
 HW 37 S, Starter gun
 HW 38, 6 shot .38 Special
 HW 88 SUPER Airweight, 5 shot 9 mm R. NC. blank firing revolver
 Western Single Action (WSA), Single Action Army clones in 9 mm R. NC. and .357 Magnum, .44 Magnum and .45 Colt cartridges.

Gallery

See also
Other German revolver brands:
 Korth
 Janz
 Rohm (defunct)

Notes

External links
 Arminius Revolvers site
 Weihrauch's official site

Revolvers of Germany
Firearm manufacturers of Germany